The following lists events that happened during 2014 in Kenya.

Incumbents
President: Uhuru Kenyatta
Deputy President: William Ruto
Chief Justice: Willy Mutunga

Events

April
April 23 - Nairobi police station bombing

May
May 4 - 2014 Nairobi bus bombings
May 16 - Gikomba bombings

June
June 15–17 - Mpeketoni attacks

July
July 5–6 - July 2014 Kenya attacks

November
 November 1 - Unidentified gunmen kill at least 20 police officers in an ambush in Turkana County.
 November 2 - An assault on a police barracks by suspected members of the Mombasa Republican Council separatist group leaves one officer and six attackers dead in Mombasa.
 November 17 - Kenyan police raid two mosques in Mombasa suspected of being linked to Al-Shabaab. One man is killed and over 200 are arrested.
 November 22 - Al-Shabaab militants hijack a bus travelling between the town of Mandera and Nairobi and execute 28 non-Muslim passengers.

December
 December 2 - The Red Cross says that at least 36 people may have been killed in an attack in Mandera County in northeastern Kenya. Al-Shabaab militants are believed to be responsible.

References 

 
Kenya
Kenya
2010s in Kenya
Years of the 21st century in Kenya